The Seven Sisters is a mountain chain in northwest County Donegal, Ireland. It is part of a larger mountain range called the Derryveagh Mountains. The Seven Sisters, from southwest to northeast, are as follows:

Errigal (751 m)
Mackoght a.k.a. Wee Errigal (555 m)
Aghla More (584 m)
Ardloughnabrackbaddy (603 m)
Aghla Beg (564 m)
Crocknalaragagh (471 m)
Muckish (666 m)

References

Mountains and hills of County Donegal
Gaeltacht places in County Donegal